Alnus rubra, the red alder,
is a deciduous broadleaf tree native to western North America (Alaska, Yukon, British Columbia, Washington, Oregon, California, Idaho and Montana).

Description
The bark is mottled, ashy-gray and smooth, often colonized by white lichen and moss. The leaves turn yellow in the autumn before falling. Female flowers occur in clusters of (3) 4–6 (8). Female catkins are erect during anthesis, but otherwise pendant. The seeds develop between the woody bracts of the 'cones' and are shed in late autumn and winter. Red alder seeds have a membranous winged margin that allows long-distance dispersal.

Specimens can live to about 60 years of age before being seriously afflicted by heart rot.

Taxonomy
The name derives from the bright rusty red color that develops in bruised or scraped bark.

Distribution

Ecology
In southern Alaska, western British Columbia and the northwestern Pacific Coast Ranges of the United States, red alder grows on cool and moist slopes; inland and at the southern end of its range (California) it grows mostly along the margins of watercourses and wetlands. It is shade intolerant.

In moist forest areas, Alnus rubra will rapidly cover a former burn or clearcut, often preventing the establishment of conifers. It is a prolific seed producer, but the small, wind-dispersed seeds require an open area of mineral soil to germinate, and so skid trails and other areas disturbed by logging or fire are ideal seedbeds. Such areas may host several hundred thousand to several million seedlings per hectare in the first year after landscape disturbance.

Twigs and buds of alder are only fair browse for wildlife, but deer and elk browse the twigs in fall and twigs and buds in the winter and spring. Beaver occasionally eat the bark, though it is not a preferred species. Several finches eat alder seeds, notably common redpoll and pine siskin, and as do deer mice. Tent caterpillars often feed on the leaves, but the trees usually recover within a year.

The tree hosts the nitrogen-fixing actinomycete Frankia in nodules on roots. This association allows alder to grow in nitrogen-poor soils, and makes the species an important early colonizer of disturbed forests and riparian areas. This self-fertilizing trait allows red alder to grow rapidly, and makes it effective in covering disturbed and/or degraded land, such as mine spoils. Alder leaves, shed in the fall, decay readily to form a nitrogen-enriched humus.

Common associates
Red alder is associated with coast Douglas-fir (Pseudotsuga menziesii subsp. menziesii), western hemlock (Tsuga heterophylla), grand fir (Abies grandis), western redcedar (Thuja plicata), and Sitka spruce (Picea sitchensis) forests.

Along stream banks, it is commonly associated with willows (Salix spp.), red osier dogwood (Cornus stolonifera), Oregon ash (Fraxinus latifolia), and bigleaf maple (Acer macrophyllum).

To the southeast of its range it is replaced by white alder (Alnus rhombifolia), which is a tree of similar stature, but which differs in the leaf margins not being rolled under, lack of distinct lobes, and lack of membranous wings on seed margins. In the high mountains it is replaced by the smaller and more shrub-like Sitka alder (Alnus viridis subsp. sinuata), and east of the Cascade Mountains by thinleaf alder (Alnus incana subsp. tenuifolia).

Uses

As dye
A russet dye can be made from a decoction of the bark, apparently due to the tannin it contains, and was used by Native Americans to dye fishing nets so as to make them less visible underwater.

Medicine
Native Americans used red alder bark to treat poison oak reactions, insect bites, and skin irritations. Blackfeet Indians used an infusion made from the bark of red alder to treat lymphatic disorders and tuberculosis. Recent clinical studies have verified that red alder contains betulin and lupeol, compounds shown to be effective against a variety of tumors.

Restoration
In addition to its use as a nitrogen fixer, red alder is occasionally used as a rotation crop to discourage the conifer root pathogen Phellinus weirii (causing laminated root rot).

Alnus rubra are occasionally planted as ornamental trees and will do well in Swales, riparian areas, or on stream banks, in light-textured soils that drain well. Red alder does not thrive in heavy, wet clay soils. If planted domestically, alders should be planted well away from drainpipes, sewage pipes, and water lines, as the roots may invade and clog the lines.

Woodworking
Alder lumber is not considered to be a durable option for outdoor applications, but due to its workability and ease of finishing it is increasingly used for furniture and cabinetry. Because it is softer than other popular hardwoods such as maple, walnut and ash, alder has historically been considered of low value for timber. However it is now becoming one of the more popular hardwood alternatives as it is economically priced compared to many other hardwoods. In the world of musical instrument construction, red alder is valued by some electric guitar / electric bass builders for its balanced tonality. Alder is frequently used by Native Americans for making masks, bowls, tool handles, and other small goods.

The appearance of alder lumber ranges from white through pinkish to light brown, has a relatively soft texture, minimal grain, and has medium luster. It is easily worked, glues well, and takes a good finish.

Fish smoking
Because of its oily smoke, A. rubra is the wood of choice for smoking salmon.

As an environmental indicator
Red alder is often used by scientists as a biomonitoring organism to locate areas prone to ozone pollution, as the leaves react to the presence of high ozone levels by developing red to brown or purple discolorations.

Forestry

With a current inventory of about 7.4 billion cubic feet, red alder comprises 60 percent of the total hardwood volume in the Pacific Northwest, and is by far the most valuable hardwood in term of diversity of products, commercial value, and manufacturing employment. Increasing value of alder logs, combined with a better understanding of the species' ecological role, has led some land managers to tolerate and, in some cases, manage for alder. Since most forest land in the Northwest is managed for conifer production, however, over 80,000 hectares of timberland are sprayed with herbicides annually in Oregon alone to control red alder and other competing hardwood species. Red alder's rapid early growth can interfere with establishment of conifer plantations Herbicide spraying of red alder over large areas of coastal Oregon and Washington has resulted in a number of lawsuits claiming this spraying has caused health problems, including birth defects and other human health effects.

In addition to adding soil nitrogen, rotations of red alder are used to reduce laminated root rot (introduced via Phellinus weirii) in Douglas-fir forests. Nurse stands of red alder may also reduce spruce weevil damage in Sitka spruce stands on the Olympic Peninsula Alder continues to attract interest as log values approach and often exceed those of Douglas-fir. This interest is limited by red alder's total stand productivity, which is significantly lower than that of Douglas-fir and western hemlock.

Gallery

References

rubra
Trees of the Northwestern United States
Trees of Western Canada
Plants described in 1833
Plant dyes
Trees of North America
Trees of the West Coast of the United States
Trees of the Western United States
Trees of the United States
Trees of Canada